Wally Straughn (born 1957) is an American politician, who served as a Democratic member of the Arizona House of Representatives from 2003 to 2005.

A United States Navy veteran who served in the Vietnam War, he was first elected in the 2002 election as a member of the Democratic Party. He served on the legislature's Commerce and Military Affairs, Public Institutions and Counties, and Judiciary committees during his term in office. Openly gay, he was an outspoken supporter of efforts to legalize same-sex marriage in Arizona.

Straughn was defeated in the 2004 primaries by Kyrsten Sinema and David Lujan, and did not return to elected politics thereafter.

References

Living people
Democratic Party members of the Arizona House of Representatives
Politicians from Phoenix, Arizona
LGBT state legislators in Arizona
Gay politicians
21st-century American politicians
1957 births